Vice Admiral Sir John Osler Chattock Hayes KCB OBE DL (9 May 1913 – 7 September 1998) was a Royal Navy officer who became Naval Secretary.

Naval career
Educated at the Royal Naval College Dartmouth, Hayes joined the Royal Navy in 1927. He served in World War II as a Navigation Officer on HMS Repulse and survived her sinking by Japanese air attack in December 1941. He then became naval liaison officer to the 2nd Battalion, the Argyll and Sutherland Highlanders and was present at the surrender of Singapore and in February 1942 and then saw the disintegration of Convoy PQ 17 on its way to Russia as 23 of its 36 ships were lost in July 1942.

He was appointed Captain at the Training Establishment HMS St Vincent in 1955. He became Commodore at the Royal Naval Barracks at Devonport in 1960 and Naval Secretary in 1962 before becoming Flag Officer (Flotillas) for the Home Fleet in 1964 and Flag Officer, Scotland and Northern Ireland in 1966. He retired in 1968.

In retirement he was appointed Chairman of the Cromarty Firth Port Authority. He also became Lord Lieutenant of Ross and Cromarty.

Family
In 1939 he married The Hon Rosalind Finlay, daughter of William Finlay, 2nd Viscount Finlay; they had two sons and one daughter.

References

|-

1913 births
1998 deaths
Royal Navy vice admirals
Royal Navy officers of World War II
Knights Commander of the Order of the Bath
Officers of the Order of the British Empire
Lord-Lieutenants of Ross and Cromarty